The Business of Murder is a British play that ran for eight years in the West End.

Plot

Stone, a humourless and dour man, invites Dee, a television playwright, over to his flat on the premise of discussing a script. Once there, she is surprised when Superintendent Hallett, the man with whom she is having an affair, also arrives for an entirely different reason.

But nothing is as it seems and as the plot twists and turns, the motive of their host Stone gradually becomes clear. They are all, it would seem, in the same business… The Business of Murder.

References

British plays
West End plays
1981 plays